Orissa Baptist Evangelistic Crusade (OBEC) is  a Baptist Christian church body in the state of Odisha in Eastern India. It is affiliated to the Baptist World Alliance. Its headquarters is in Bhubaneswar. OBEC has 405,000 baptized members and more than 650,000 total communicant members in 3,865 churches.

History 
On 7 February 1822, William Bampton, James Pegg of General Baptist Missionary Society of England reached Orissa at the Pattamundai Coast and preached in Berhampur. The first baptism took place in Berhampur on December 25, 1827, of Shri Eron Senapoti served by Bampton. The first ordination of the Oriya preachers Gangadhar Sarangi and Ramchandra Jee Jachuck took place in 1835. In 1867 Indian Auxiliary Mission was formed and continued until 1899. Then, Indian Baptist Missionary Society was formed and continued till 1909. Afterward, that society continued under another name, Utkal Christian Church Union, until 1933, when it changed its name again not as a Union but as part of a Central Council. Later the Orissa Baptist Evangelistic Crusade took over the evangelical responsibility of Orissa Baptists since 1969 independently. As of 1 January 2006, OBEC has 26 consolidated Unions, 3240 churches and about 648,000 members above 13 years and 300,000 baptized believers.

See also
 Christianity in Odisha
 Christianity in India

References 

Baptist denominations in India